Adonis Adelecino Jordan (born August 21, 1970) is an American former professional basketball player. An All-Big Eight guard who played collegiately at the University of Kansas, Jordan was the starting point guard during the school's 1991 and 1993 Final Four appearances.  Together with shooting guard teammate Rex Walters, the two established Kansas as having one of the top backcourts in the NCAA during the 1992–93 season. He was later drafted in the 1993 NBA Draft but only appeared in only 10 career games in the league (six with the Denver Nuggets during the 1993–94 season and four with the Milwaukee Bucks during the lockout-shortened 1999 NBA season). He spent the bulk of his professional career playing overseas with various basketball clubs.

Early life
Adonis Jordan was born as the fourth son to Josephine Jordan in Brooklyn, New York.  His mother named her son after the Greek mythological character Adonis, a handsome young man who was fabled to be the love interest of the goddess Aphrodite. She worked as a secretary for an insurance company while her son spent his time playing pick-up street basketball on Brooklyn blacktop courts.  Jordan was enrolled by his mother at Theodore Roosevelt High School in Yonkers, New York, across town from where she worked.  Although the decision necessitated a 45-minute commute each way, she could be assured that her son would receive an education in a safer environment compared to their Brooklyn surroundings.  Jordan played high school basketball at Roosevelt High and blossomed in his second year, being one of only two sophomores named to the New York All-City team.  However, Jordan's stay in New York was cut short when his mother suddenly decided to relocate to California in 1987 after a two-week visit to see relatives in the state.

Jordan moved from one coast to another and resettled in Los Angeles after his sophomore year in high school. He transferred to Cleveland High School in Reseda and joined future NBA veteran Lucious Harris as stars of the school's varsity basketball team.  The New York native was a big factor on the Cleveland High Cavaliers' squad, playing big roles on offense (averaging 13.8 points a game) and defense (averaging 5.9 steals per game) during the 1987–88 season.  At the start of his senior year, Jordan was considered by some to be one of the state's top point guards and was named among the nation's 50 top-rated high school seniors by basketball scout Bob Gibbons. He completed his final high school season averaging 24.3 points and 13.4 assists per game, leading the Cavaliers to a 23–3 record and to the quarterfinals of the City Section tournament while earning back-to-back Valley 4-A All-League First Team recognition.

College career
While at Cleveland High, Jordan was heavily recruited by collegiate basketball programs, including the University of Kansas. At the time, Kansas was suffering from NCAA sanctions that stemmed from recruiting violations under former coach Larry Brown. Though the scandal dissuaded other potential high school prospects from attending Kansas, Jordan nonetheless decided to take a chance with the school after he was impressed by the university's friendly and personal atmosphere. In the 1989–90 season, freshman Jordan came off the bench to back up starting Jayhawks point guard Kevin Pritchard.  Together they helped lead Kansas to a surprising record of 30–5 under second-year coach Roy Williams.  With Pritchard's graduation, Jordan became the starting point guard for the 1990–91 season, leading the 27–8 Kansas Jayhawks to the Final Four during his sophomore year.  Jordan averaged 12.5 points and recorded 151 assists that season while the team managed three upset victories in the 1991 NCAA Tournament against Indiana (Sweet Sixteen), the Southeast Regional number one seed Arkansas (Elite Eight) and Eastern Regional number one seed North Carolina (National Semifinals) before finishing as National Runnerup to Duke in the National Championship game.

Two years later, senior Jordan and teammate Rex Walters helped lead the Jayhawks to further success when they captured the 1993 Big Eight Regular Season Championship and the second seed in the Midwest Region of the 1993 NCAA Men's Division I Basketball Tournament with a 25–6 record.  Jordan and Walters' stellar backcourt performance earned them a reputation as one of the NCAA's best guard combinations. Kansas marched through the NCAA tournament, beating Midwest Region number one seed Indiana in the Regional Final to advance to the Final Four for the second time in three years.  Though Kansas eventually finished at 29–7 with a loss to North Carolina in the Final Four, the team's outstanding performance that year earned the squad a top ten nationwide ranking during the regular season, including a brief time spent at number one.  Jordan's legacy with Kansas is also recognized in holding the Jayhawks' number six spot for most assists in the school's history and is 22nd on the school's all-time scoring list.

Professional career
Jordan was drafted by the Seattle SuperSonics in the 1993 NBA Draft after a storied basketball career at Kansas.  Seattle ended up cutting the rookie at the start of the 1993–94 NBA season but Jordan reemerged in the league after being picked up by the Denver Nuggets later in the month on a 10-day contract.  He appeared in six games with Denver before being waived again but finished the season in the CBA with the Rochester Renegades and the Sioux Falls Skyforce.  The former Jayhawk headed to Australia in what would become the start of a series of overseas stints.  His first stop landed him with the Australian National Basketball League's South East Melbourne Magic, where he led the team to an impressive record in 1994.  After playing one season in Israel, Jordan headed to Venezuela where he joined the Cocodrilos de Caracas of the Liga Profesional de Baloncesto.  With five years of overseas experience, the globetrotter returned to the States and signed two 10-day contracts with the Milwaukee Bucks in early 1999.  He donned a Bucks uniform in four games before ultimately being released in March. Jordan returned overseas later that same year, where he would eventually finish his professional career.  He played a season with the Finnish Tapiolan Honka basketball club in 1999–2000 and returned to Australia where he retired after playing for the Victoria Giants. In 2010, Jordan returned to basketball with the Chelsea Gulls of the Big V, a Victorian basketball league. Later that year, he became a coach with the Nunawading Spectres.

Personal life
Jordan appeared in the 1994 basketball film, Blue Chips as the starting point guard for a Rick Pitino-coached college team.  After retiring from basketball, Jordan accepted an offer to coach the Topeka Tornado of the short-lived semi-pro All-American Professional Basketball League in 2005. He now resides in Victoria, Australia with his daughter.

Awards and accomplishments
2x Valley 4-A All-League First Team (1987–88, 1988–89)
Street & Smith's All-American Honorable Mention (1988)
U.S. Olympic Festival: Men's Basketball West Team (1989)
World University Games: United States Men's Basketball (1991)
AP All-Big Eight Second Team (1990–91)
AP All-Big Eight First Team (1991–92)
1998 KBL All Star

References

External links
Adonis Jordan NBA stats @ basketball-reference.com
Adonis Jordan @ IMDB.com

1970 births
Living people
American expatriate basketball people in Australia
American expatriate basketball people in Finland
American expatriate basketball people in Hong Kong
American expatriate basketball people in Israel
American expatriate basketball people in South Korea
American expatriate basketball people in Venezuela
American men's basketball players
Basketball players from Los Angeles
Basketball players from New York City
Suwon KT Sonicboom players
Cocodrilos de Caracas players
Denver Nuggets players
GET Vosges players
Hapoel Jerusalem B.C. players
Israeli Basketball Premier League players
Kansas Jayhawks men's basketball players
Korean Basketball League players
Maccabi Jerusalem B.C. players
Medalists at the 1991 Summer Universiade
Milwaukee Bucks players
People from Reseda, Los Angeles
Point guards
Seattle SuperSonics draft picks
Sioux Falls Skyforce (CBA) players
South East Melbourne Magic players
Sportspeople from Brooklyn
Universiade gold medalists for the United States
Universiade medalists in basketball